Axel Marcel Addy served as Minister of Commerce and Industry under Ellen Johnson Sirleaf from April 2013 to January 2018. While in office, he focused on investment diversification, agriculture, small and medium businesses, and integration into the world economy. He was Chief Negotiator during Liberia's successful accession to the World Trade Organization.

References

 
 
 
 
 
 
 
 
 
 
 
 
 
 

1976 births
Living people
Politicians from Monrovia
University of California, Los Angeles alumni
California State University, Long Beach alumni
Alumni of Saïd Business School
Government ministers of Liberia
21st-century Liberian politicians